Nacaduba beroe, the opaque six-line blue, is a lycaenid butterfly found in South and Southeast Asia. The species was first described by Cajetan Felder and Rudolf Felder in 1865.

References

External links
 With images.

Nacaduba
Butterflies described in 1865
Butterflies of Asia
Taxa named by Baron Cajetan von Felder
Taxa named by Rudolf Felder